Kam (also known as Makān Ghīr Maskūnī Mastoqol) is a village in Dizaj Rural District, in the Central District of Khoy County, West Azerbaijan Province, Iran. At the 2006 census, its population was 20, in 4 families.

References 

Populated places in Khoy County